Michael Johannes Madsen (born 26 March 1958 in Copenhagen, Hovedstaden) is a retired male light-heavyweight boxer from Denmark, who represented his native country at the 1980 Summer Olympics in Moscow, Soviet Union.

There he was eliminated in the second round by Cuba's Ricardo Rojas on points (1-4) after having defeated Csaba Kuzma (Hungary) in the first round. Madsen was one out of three boxers representing Denmark at the 1980 Summer Olympics, the other ones being Jesper Garnell (lightweight) and Ole Svendsen (welterweight).

References

 sports-reference

1958 births
Living people
Light-heavyweight boxers
Boxers at the 1980 Summer Olympics
Olympic boxers of Denmark
Sportspeople from Copenhagen
Danish male boxers